Phraortes (died c. 653 BC), son of Deioces, was the second king of the Median Empire.

Like his father Deioces, Phraortes started wars against Assyria, but was defeated and killed by Ashurbanipal, the king of the Neo-Assyrian Empire (668 – c. 627 BC).

Biography
All information about him is from Herodotus. According to him (1.102), Phraortes was the son of Deioces and united all Median tribes into a single state. He also subjugated the Persians and Parthians while still a vassal of the Assyrian kings Esarhaddon and Ashurbanipal, and began to conquer other nations of Ancient Iran. After a rule of twenty-two years (c. 675 – c. 653 BC), he fell in battle against the Assyrians, who reasserted their subjugation of the Medes, Persians and Parthians. However, some scholars assume that he ruled for fifty-three years, c. 678 – c. 625. Phraortes is commonly identified with Kashtariti, a chieftain in Media, although some scholars consider such an identification doubtful. He was later succeeded by his son Cyaxares.

References

External links

Median kings
7th-century BC rulers in Asia
7th-century BC Iranian people
7th-century BC births
650s BC deaths
Monarchs killed in action
Median dynasty